Zwarte is the Dutch word for black and may refer to:

Zwarte Piet, companion of Saint Nicholas in the folklore and legends of the Netherlands and Flanders
The Zwarte Water, a Dutch river
The Étangs Noirs/Zwarte Vijvers metro station, a Brussels Metro station
Zwarte Paard, a Dutch hamlet
Piet de Zwarte, Dutch water polo player